Brian Ó Corcrán, Irish poet,  Ó Corcrán's floruit is uncertain. An earlier Brian Ó Corcrán is listed as a vicar. The surname is now rendered as Corcoran (surname).

Ó Corcrán authored two surviving poems, Mo chion dot bhronnadh, a Bhriain and Rí con Éireann Ábhartach

The first verse of Mo chion dot bhronnadh, a Bhriain is the following:

Rí con Éireann Ábhartach, a poem on Irish kings, begins:

See also

 Felimidh Ó Corcrán
 Cahalan Ó Corcrán
 Fláithrí Ó Corcrán

References

 Irish Bardic Poetry, Ed. Osborn Bergin, Dublin, Dublin Institute for Advanced Studies (1970) page 63-65.
 * The Surnames of Ireland, Edward MacLysaght, 1978.

External links
 http://www.ucc.ie/celt/published/G402213/index.html
 http://www.irishtimes.com/ancestor/surname/index.cfm?fuseaction=Go.&UserID=

Irish-language poets
Year of death missing
17th-century Irish writers
Year of birth missing